The Guild of Scholars of the Episcopal Church is a society of lay Episcopal academics, teachers, artists and professional practitioners   which for many years met  annually at General Theological Seminary in New York in November of each year. Since 2011, it has met in locations around the US such as Cincinnati, Albuquerque, Holy Cross Monastery in the Hudson Valley, Hope College in Holland, Michigan, and most recently at the Virginia Theological Seminary. 

The guild was founded in 1938 by American philologist and medieval historian Urban T. Holmes, Jr. and has included notable members such as W. H. Auden, Cleanth Brooks, Brooks Otis, Henry Babcock Veatch, Frederick Pottle, Stringfellow Barr, George Parshall, Marshall Fishwick, Margaret Morgan Lawrence, Ursula Niebuhr, Dell Hymes, Hyatt Waggoner, Howard Roelofs, Hoxie Fairchild, Walter Lowrie (author), Charles Forker, and Richard W. Bailey.

Current Members
Current members include the literary academics John V. Fleming, Debora Shuger, Marsha Dutton, Jameela Lares, and Nicholas Birns, the musician Royce Boyer, the religious historians David L. Holmes, Philip Jenkins, and Robert Bruce Mullin, archivists Mark Duffy, Michael Krasulski, Richard Mammana, and the classicist Warren Smith. David Hurd offered a regular organ recital for many years when the Guild was meeting in New York.

Chaplains
Norman Pittenger
J. Robert Wright

External links
Guild of Scholars of the Episcopal Church website

Anglicanism